Hoseynabad-e Pur Akbari (also Romanized as Ḩoseynābād-e Pūr Ākbarī; also known as Ḩoseynābād and Husainābād) is a village in Rostaq Rural District, in the Central District of Saduq County, Yazd Province, Iran. At the 2006 census, its population was 25, in 13 families.

References 

Populated places in Saduq County